Huron Valley State Bank is a community bank founded in 2005 by a group of local investors.  Huron Valley State Bank is insured by the Federal Deposit Insurance Corporation (FDIC) and is an Equal Housing Lender.

History
Huron Valley State Bank is headquartered in Milford, Michigan. The bank was founded in 2005 by Clarkston Financial Corporation as a de novo bank. Huron Valley State Bank (HVSB) became independent of Clarkston Financial Corporation in 2008. HVSB serves the communities of Milford, Highland, Hartland, Commerce Township, and White Lake Township, Michigan.  Since 2005, Huron Valley State Bank has expanded through the opening of two full branches and a loan center.

Main Street Loan Center
Opened in June 2012, the Main Street Lending Center is Huron Valley State Bank's newest expansion.  The loan department offers New/Used Auto, Boat/RV, Motorcycle, and Personal Loans.  In addition to consumer loans, Huron Valley State Bank specializes in business lending.  The Huron Valley State Bank Main Street Loan Center is located on North Main Street between the Flat Iron Building and Commerce Road.

Branches

References

Banks based in Michigan